The South African cricket team toured England in the 1947 season to play a five-match Test series against England. The team was captained by Alan Melville with Dudley Nourse as his vice-captain (v/c). England won the series with three wins and two matches drawn. This was the second Test series hosted by England since the end of World War II in 1945. South Africa's previous visit to England was their successful 1935 tour.

Background
1947 was a year in which the weather frequently made headlines in Great Britain. After one of the coldest winters on record, the summer was uncharacteristically warm and sunny. In terms of cricket, what the new Playfair Cricket Annual called a "glorious summer" contrasted sharply with the wet summer of 1946. The country was still recovering from the war with austerity and rationing a fact of daily life, but sporting events were eagerly awaited and drew large attendances.

South African squad
South Africa brought a 17-man squad captained by Alan Melville. Squad details below state the player's age at the beginning of the tour, his batting hand, his type of bowling, and his provincial Currie Cup team at the time:

England selections
England chose a total of 21 players to represent them in the series. Five players took part in all five Test matches: captain Norman Yardley; batsmen Len Hutton, Cyril Washbrook and Denis Compton; and wicket-keeper Godfrey Evans.

Test series summary

First Test

Second Test

Third Test

Fourth Test

Fifth Test

References

Bibliography

Further reading
 Louis Duffus, South African Cricket, Volume 3, 1927-1947, The South African Cricket Association, 1948 
 Various writers, A Century of South Africa in Test & International Cricket 1889-1989, Ball, 1989

External links
 CricketArchive – tour summaries
 Short British Pathe newsreel of the team arriving in England and signing autographs

1947 in English cricket
1947 in South African cricket
1947
International cricket competitions from 1945–46 to 1960
South African
South African
South African